The X-Files Season 10 may refer to:

The X-Files Season 10 (comics),  published by IDW Publishing in 2013
The X-Files (season 10), broadcast by Fox Broadcasting Company in 2016